Maurice Barrier (8 June 1932 – 12 April 2020) was a French actor and singer.

Biography
Barrier was the son of a cabinetmaker, and had his first job working in his father's workshop. While in Rennes at age 28, he met several resident actors at the Théâtre National de Bretagne and made his stage debut in Caligula, written by Albert Camus.

His first major role on television was in the film The Taking of Power by Louis XIV. His other major films included The Tall Blond Man with One Black Shoe, Two Men in Town, Black and White in Color, Coup de tête, and Flic Story. He played alongside several actors, such as Jean-Paul Belmondo, Jean Gabin, Alain Delon, Pierre Richard, Gérard Depardieu, and Gérard Jugnot.

Barrier was married to the actress Hélène Manesse. The pair resided in Montréal, France from 1962 until Maurice's death on 12 April 2020 in Montbard at the age of 87 due to COVID-19.

References

External links

1932 births
2020 deaths
20th-century French actors
French male stage actors
French male television actors
French male film actors
People from Sarthe
People from Yonne
Deaths from the COVID-19 pandemic in France